Ruth Hardy (born 1970) is an American political figure from East Middlebury, Vermont.  A Democrat, she was elected to the Vermont Senate in 2018.

Early life
Ruth Ellen Hardy was born in the Tompkins County area of New York circa 1970, a daughter of Robert B. Hardy Jr. and Miriam (Smith) Hardy.  Robert Hardy (1930-2005) was a graduate of Cornell University and Cornell Law School, and he served for more than thirty years as an Administrative Law Judge for the New York State Department of Labor.  Ruth Hardy was raised and educated in Tompkins County and is a 1988 graduate of Dryden High School in Dryden, New York.

Hardy received a Bachelor of Arts degree in Government from Oberlin College in 1992 and in 1996 she received a Master of Public Affairs degree from the Lyndon B. Johnson School of Public Affairs at the University of Texas at Austin.  She was a fiscal analyst for the Wisconsin Legislative Fiscal Bureau and specialized in education issues.  Hardy moved to East Middlebury, Vermont in 2002.

Career
After relocating to Vermont, Hardy served as executive director of the Open Door Clinic in Middlebury, Vermont.  In addition, she worked as assistant budget director at Middlebury College, and director of government grants at Planned Parenthood of Northern New England.  She also served as executive director of Emerge Vermont, which recruits and trains women to run for public office.

Hardy served three terms on Middlebury-area school boards and was chairwoman of Middlebury's Mary Hogan School Board, co-chairwoman of the Addison Central Supervisory Union Unification Charter Committee, and Chair of the Addison Central School District Finance Committee.  She is a graduate of the Snelling Center's Vermont Leadership Institute.

Vermont Senate
In early 2018, incumbent Democrat Claire D. Ayer announced that she would not be a candidate for reelection to the Vermont Senate in the two-member at-large Addison County Senate District.  Hardy announced her candidacy in May.  In the November general election, Hardy and incumbent Democrat Christopher Bray were the top two finishers.

At the start of her Senate term, Hardy was appointed to the Committees on Education and Agriculture, and was named clerk of the Agriculture Committee.  In addition, she was named to the Senate's special panel on sexual harassment and the Joint Committee on Judicial Retention.

Family
In 1997, Hardy married Jason Mittell, professor of Film & Media at Middlebury College.  They are the parents of three children.

References

Sources

Newspapers

Internet

1970 births
Living people
21st-century American politicians
21st-century American women politicians
Oberlin College alumni
Lyndon B. Johnson School of Public Affairs alumni
People from Middlebury, Vermont
Democratic Party Vermont state senators
Women state legislators in Vermont